A by-election was held for the New South Wales Legislative Assembly electorate of Orange on 19 February 1877 caused by the resignation of sitting member Harris Nelson.

Dates

Results

Harris Nelson resigned.

See also
Electoral results for the district of Orange
List of New South Wales state by-elections

References

1877 elections in Australia
New South Wales state by-elections
1870s in New South Wales